Tawhid Party is a political party in Lebanon established by former minister and MP Weaam Wahhab on May 26, 2006. Supporters of the party are mainly Druze and it is a part of the March 8 Alliance.

References

2006 establishments in Lebanon
Arab nationalism in Lebanon
Arab nationalist political parties
March 8 Alliance
Political parties established in 2006
Political parties in Lebanon